Boëcé is a commune in the Orne department in north-western France.

Changes in population

See also
Communes of the Orne department

References

Communes of Orne